Kevin Boyle may refer to:

 Kevin Boyle (historian) (born 1960), American author and professor of history at Ohio State University
 Kevin Boyle (lawyer) (1943–2010), Northern Ireland-born human rights activist, barrister and educator
 Kevin J. Boyle (born 1980), member of the Pennsylvania House of Representatives
Kevin Boyle (ice hockey) (born 1992), American ice hockey goaltender

See also
 Kevin Boyles (born 1967), former volleyball player for Canada
 Boyle (disambiguation)